Wu Shiow-ming (born 2 June 1960) is a Taiwanese professor of competition law and a politician. He was the Chairperson of the Fair Trade Commission from 1 August 2009 to 31 January 2017. It is the first time that the Chairperson has the academic experience about competition law.

Education
Wu obtained his bachelor's and master's degrees in law from National Chengchi University (NCCU) in 1983 and 1986, respectively. He then obtained his doctoral degree from University of Munich in Germany.

Early career
Upon graduation from Germany, Wu became a professor at the College of Law of NCCU. He served as an adjunct professor of the Institute of Technology Law at National Chiao Tung University from 2001 to 2008.

References

1960 births
Living people
Political office-holders in the Republic of China on Taiwan